Grafton and Radcot is a civil parish in West Oxfordshire. The parish includes the hamlets of Radcot on the River Thames and Grafton.

Civil parishes in Oxfordshire
West Oxfordshire District